WLKR-FM (95.3 MHz) – branded 95-3 WLKR – is a commercial adult album alternative radio station licensed to Norwalk, Ohio, serving the Norwalk/Sandusky/Port Clinton area (collectively referred to as Vacationland and/or the Firelands), including Erie and Huron counties. Owned by the Elyria-Lorain Broadcasting Co., WLKR-FM is the local affiliate for CBS News Radio and the Agri Broadcast Network, and serves as an affiliate of the Cleveland Guardians Radio Network, the Ohio State Sports Network and Cavaliers AudioVerse. The station also airs coverage of local high school sports, including football, volleyball, basketball, wrestling, softball and baseball. The WLKR-FM studios are located in Milan, while the station transmitter resides near the intersection of Huber Road and Lamereaux Road just outside of Norwalk.  In addition to a standard analog transmission, WLKR-FM is also available online.

History
WLKR-FM started broadcasting in 1962, with the AM counterpart, WLKR (AM), starting in 1968. The station was founded by Port Clinton, Ohio resident Robert W. Reider, who eventually started and operated WLKR-AM-FM, WRWR in Port Clinton, WAWR in Bowling Green, and WKTN in Kenton, all via his "Ohio Radio Incorporated" banner. For many years, the station held a full service adult contemporary format, and was an ABC News Radio affiliate, covering Paul Harvey News and Comment among other long-form news features.

In September 1979, WLKR AM and FM were sold over to Firelands Broadcasting, headed first by longtime station general manager James Westerhold, and later David Mehling. Both stations were then sold to the Elyria, Ohio-based Elyria-Lorain Broadcasting Co. in February 2002. WLKR has since maintained its local presence, while the music programming was first streamlined into a traditional adult contemporary. It assumed an adult album alternative format in March 2007.

WLKR-FM also supplies newscasts to sister stations WLKR and WKFM; Josh Bowman was hired as WLKR-FM's News and Sports Director in late May 2016.

Programming
WLKR's current weekday lineup features the morning show with Melissa and Johnny S, Kelly Rose mid-days and Chris Morgan in afternoons. Newscasts are handled by Josh Bowman and Craig Adams. WLKR-FM also serves as the local affiliate for CBS News Radio and the Agri Broadcast Network.

References

External links

LKR-FM
Adult album alternative radio stations in the United States
Radio stations established in 1962